Murat Önal (born 20 July 1987 in Salihli, Manisa, Turkey) is a Turkish-born Dutch footballer of Kazakh descent who plays as a striker for FC Lisse in the Topklasse.

Önal began his career with Amsterdamsche FC and was promoted to the first team in the latter half of the 2005–06 season, appearing in seven league matches during the course of the campaign. He then moved to Club Brugge K.V. and spent the season with the club's youth team. Önal returned to the Netherlands and signed a contract with the reserves of ADO Den Haag. After a successful season Önal joined FC Volendam in July 2008. Having mainly appeared for the reserve, he made his debut in the Eredivisie on 8 March 2009 against Vitesse Arnhem. In April 2009, Önal signed a professional contract with Volendam until 2011.

References

External links
Murat Onal at Futbol.pl
Murat Onal at igol.pl

1987 births
Living people
Dutch people of Turkish descent
Dutch footballers
FC Volendam players
Eredivisie players
Eerste Divisie players
Dutch expatriate footballers
Expatriate footballers in Finland
Association football forwards
People from Salihli
AC Kajaani players